YSR Kanti Velugu is a program launched by the Government of Andhra Pradesh to provide universal eye care to five crore citizens of the state through various phases.

Development 
The scheme was launched by Chief minister of Andhra Pradesh Y. S. Jagan Mohan Reddy on 10 October 2019 on the occasion of World Sight Day where 70 lakh school children were screened in phase one.

The second phase of YSR Kanti Velugu started from 1 November 2019 where eye operations were performed for those in need.

Third phase of the scheme was launched by Y. S. Jagan Mohan Reddy on 18 February 2020 benefitting 57 lakh elderly people.

The scheme 
YSR Kanti Velugu was launched to provide universal eye care to all the citizens by screening and detecting the problem if there is any at an early stage and conduct necessary surgeries.

The scheme has been designed in six phases over the period of three years with an approximate budget of 560.88 Crores.

References 

Government welfare schemes in Andhra Pradesh
Eye care in India